Ganpat may refer to
Ganpat University in Gujarat, India
Ganpat Patil (1920–2008), Indian actor 
Ganpat Rao Gaekwad (1816–1856), Indian Maharaja
Jayant Ganpat Nadkarni, Indian Navy admiral
Palwankar Ganpat, Indian cricketer 
Thakur Ganpat Singh (1895–?), Indian politician
Martin Louis Alan Gompertz, Anglo-Indian soldier and writer, also known by the pseudonym of 'Ganpat'

See also
Ganpatrao